Gilles Djehani N'Guissan Yao (born 1 February 1990) is a Togolese footballer who plays as a goalkeeper for ACS Hayableh.

Career

Before the season, N'Guissan signed for Nigerian side Enugu Rangers. After that, he signed for AS Port in Djibouti.

References

External links
 
 Djehani N'Guissan at playmakerstats.com

Togolese footballers
1990 births
Living people
Association football goalkeepers
Togo international footballers